Uzeir is an Arab village in northern Israel. Located near Nazareth Illit in the Lower Galilee, it falls under the jurisdiction of al-Batuf Regional Council.

History
Findings from the Roman, Byzantine and Early Islamic periods have been found in the village.

Ottoman era
The land  was  designated as Timar land.

In 1799, a map from Napoleon's invasion by Pierre Jacotin  showed the place, named as El Qasr.

In 1838 it was noted as a Muslim village, el-'Aziz,  in the Nazareth District.

In 1875, the French explorer Victor Guérin reached the village and described it as consisting of about 20 houses on the side of a hill. A few old columns were remains after an ancient site which had preceded the present village. A Muslim  Maqam  with two small domes, dedicated to "Neby A'ouzeir"  was close by. In Palestine Exploration Fund's  1881 Survey of Western Palestine, the village  (called El Azeir) was described as: A stone village at the foot of the hill. The plain to the north is cultivated with cotton, barley, etc. There are about 150 Moslems in the village. Water is supplied by cisterns in the village, and a tank.

A population list from about 1887 showed that  el Azeir had about  45 Muslim inhabitants.

British Mandate era
In the  1922 census of Palestine conducted by the British authorities, 'Uzair had a population of 70, all Muslims, increasing in the 1931 census to 88, still all Muslim, in 15  houses.

In the 1945 statistics  the population was 150 Muslims while the total land area was 766 dunams, according to an official land and population survey. Of this, 737 dunams were allocated for cereals, while 7 dunams were classified as built-up areas.

State of Israel
In 1948, Uzeir was captured by the Israeli army during the second part of Operation Dekel between 15 and 18 July. The village remained under martial law until 1966.

See also
Arab localities in Israel

References

Bibliography

External links
Welcome To 'Uzeir
Survey of Western Palestine, Map 6:  IAA, Wikimedia commons

Arab villages in Israel
Al-Batuf Regional Council
Populated places in Northern District (Israel)